Kyle Basler (born December 27, 1982) is a former American football punter. He was signed by the Cleveland Browns as an undrafted free agent out of Washington State.

High School years
Basler attended Elma High School and helped his team to the state Championship in his freshman year.

College career
Basler attended Washington State. He played in 48 games and his 255 career punts for 10,794 yards was a school record. He was a sports management major.

Professional career
Basler was selected by the Cleveland Browns as an undrafted free agent. However, he was cut at the end of training camp. He was signed to the Browns' active roster following the end of the 2006 season and was allocated to NFL Europa where he played for the Frankfurt Galaxy.

External links
 Cleveland Browns bio

References

Further reading

1982 births
Living people
Sportspeople from Olympia, Washington
American football punters
Washington State Cougars football players
Cleveland Browns players
Frankfurt Galaxy players